This article is a list of productions by the American animated studio Warner Bros. Animation, which is part of the Warner Bros. Television division of Warner Bros. Entertainment, owned by Warner Bros. Discovery. This includes animated feature films, shorts, specials, and television series.

Feature films

Theatrical features

Compilation films

Original films 

 Combines live action with animation.

Direct-to-video features 

 An adult animated production.

Television films

Other film credits

Short films

Short subjects

Television shorts

Direct-to-video shorts

Theme park shorts

Television series

Original series

Short series

Specials

Television pilots

Other television credits

Commercials 

 9Lives (1979-1980, with Duck Soup Produckions)
 Aflac (2004)
 Air Jordan
 Alpha-Bits
 American Express (1998)
 Astral Paint
 AT&T
 AutoNation (2016)
 Boomerang (2017)
 Borden
 Brach's
 Burger King (1997)
 Canon Inc.
 Cartoon Network
 Cheetos
 Chevrolet Monte Carlo (1998, 2000)
 Crush
 DEX One
 DirecTV
 Energizer (1994)
 Gatorade
 GEICO (2021)
 Golden Crisp
 Hallmark Cards (1998)
 Hershey's
 Holiday Inn
 Honey Nut Cheerios
 Honeycomb
 Jeep
 KFC
 Kith (2020, with Renegade Animation)
 Kool-Aid
 Kraft Foods (1990s)
 Laffy Taffy
 Listerine
 McDonald's (1990s, 2011)
 MCI (1998–2000)
 Michelin
 Miles Laboratories
 Miracle Whip (1999)
 Nike (1992, 2015)
 Oldsmobile
 Pebbles (2000)
 Pepsi (1996, with StarToons)
 Pontiac (1998, with Industrial Light and Magic)
 Purolator Inc.
 RadioShack (1997)
 Raisin Bran
 Rocket Mortgage (2018)
 Scooby-Doo Cereal (2002-2003, with Mercury Filmworks)
 Sedex
 Shell Oil Company
 Shriners Hospitals for Children
 Six Flags Parks
 Sony
 Spectrum
 Sprint (1998)
 State Farm (2013)
 Subway
 Target (1996)
 Toyota
 TriNa
 Trix
 Tyco Toys
 Tyson Foods
 Visa (1996, with USAnimation)
 Walkers
 Warner Bros. Family Entertainment (1993)
 Warner Bros. Catalog (1989)
 Warner Village Cinemas
 The WB (1995-1998)
 Weetabix
 Wendy's
 Westfield Corporation
 Ziploc

See also 
 Warner Bros. Cartoons
 List of Warner Bros. Cartoons productions
 Warner Animation Group
 List of Warner Animation Group productions
 Cartoon Network Studios
 List of Cartoon Network Studios productions
 Looney Tunes and Merrie Melodies filmography
 List of Warner Bros. theatrical animated features
 List of unproduced Warner Bros. Animation projects

Notes

References 

Warner Bros. Discovery-related lists
Lists of Warner Bros. films
Productions